Benedict Carton is associate professor of history at George Mason University. He is a specialist in the history of Southern Africa and the author of Blood from Your Children: Colonial Origins of Generational Conflict in South Africa (University of Virginia Press, 2000).

References

External links
 Benedict Carton GMU Faculty profile

21st-century American historians
21st-century American male writers
Historians of Africa
George Mason University faculty
Living people
Year of birth missing (living people)
American male non-fiction writers